Sidney Harry Riesenberg (12 December 1885 – 11 October 1971) was an illustrator and artist who lived in Yonkers, New York, and commuted to his studio in New York City by train. He was known as a professional illustrator for his posters for the United States Marine Corps and the Liberty bond programs, for his illustrations for book covers, magazines, and for oil paintings of diverse subjects. He retired from his professional work and dedicated his full-time energy to painting fine arts and teaching. In 1937 he began spending summers in Rockport, Massachusetts, where he painted scenes of the small fishing town. He was active in the Rockport Art Association, teaching oil painting and participating in water color figure painting classes.

Biography
Riesenberg was born in 1885 in Chicago. He was educated at the School of the Art Institute of Chicago, where he was recognized for his compositions in oil. He moved to Yonkers in 1905 where he began his career as a professional illustrator, after a sojourn in the American west pursuing what became a lifelong interest in depicting the frontier west as was being popularized then by Zane Grey and other writers. In the early 1930s, he began doing illustration work for magazines. In the 1930s and 1940s, his work was often featured at venues such as the National Academy of Design and in organizations such as the Allied Artists of America. In the 1950s he was an art instructor at the Westchester Workshop in White Plains, New York. Riesenberg was also vice president of the Yonkers Art Association.

Riesenberg had an older brother, Felix, with whom he was close. Riensenberg died in 1971 in Cambridge, Massachusetts.

Works

Of Riesenberg's work, his contributions during World War I are well known and he is described as "one of the greatest illustrators of the World War I era."  Riensenberg's style, it has been said, shows influences from Impressionism.

He produced many posters for the Marines in addition to posters advertising the Liberty Loan campaign during World War I. One of Riesenberg's most well known works is his 1918 World War I-era poster, Over the Top for You, which illustrates a young doughboy clutching the American flag. With its bold illustration and concise text, like many war posters of the time, Over the Top for You encouraged the public to support its military by purchasing liberty loans. Among other posters, it was selected to display in the Smithsonian American Art Museum under the exhibit, Over the Top: American Posters from World War I. Riesenberg also created several posters for the United States Navy, one of which, titled Democracy's Vanguard, illustrates Marines landing from a boat to initiate an offensive. Another illustrated uniformed soldiers raising the flag against the background of a warship.

Riesenberg created illustrations, including covers, for many publications such as Boys' Life Magazine, the monthly magazine of the Boy Scouts of America, Harper's and The Saturday Evening Post. His many thematic subjects included scenes from places he lived, historical and action scenes, portraits, as well as depicting the Old West.

References

Further reading
 Fielding, Mantle. "Riesenberg, Sidney". Mantle Fielding's Dictionary of American Painters, Sculptors & Engravers. 1983. 
 United States, et al. Recruiting Posters Issued by the U.S. Army and Navy Since the Declaration of World War 1. [Washington, D.C.]: Press, U.S. Navy Recruiting Bureau, 1918.

External links
 

1885 births
1971 deaths
American illustrators
American poster artists
20th-century American painters
American male painters
Military art
Artists from Chicago
School of the Art Institute of Chicago alumni
People from Yonkers, New York
20th-century American male artists